Leopold Adler II (April 18, 1923 – January 29, 2012) was an American historic preservationist based in Savannah, Georgia. President of the Historic Savannah Foundation, he was instrumental in the preservation movement in his hometown.

He appeared in John Berendt's best-selling 1994 book Midnight in the Garden of Good and Evil.

Life and career 
Adler was born on April 18, 1923, in Savannah, Georgia, to Samuel Guckenheim Adler and Elinor Grunsfeld, owners of Adler's department store on Broughton Street. He was named for his paternal grandfather, Leopold I, a native of Austria.

He attended Savannah's Pape School, before graduating from Deerfield Academy in Massachusetts in 1942.

Later in 1942, Adler enlisted in the United States Navy Air Corps.

After World War II, he studied at Brown University. He completed his degree at the University of Georgia in Athens, Georgia, in 1950.

Adler married Emma Morel, daughter of John Morel and Emma Walthour, on September 12, 1953, with whom he had two children: John Morel and Leopold III. Emma later became a member of the Historic Savannah Foundation, of which her mother-in-law, Elinor, was one of the seven founders. Lee became its president in 1961 and served six terms. He wrote a handbook on preservation in 1974.

In 1959, after learning that a 400-year-old Savannah town house was about to become demolished, he made a deal to purchase the entire row for $54,000, with the 300 members of the Foundation agreeing to share the cost.

Adler's father died in 1979, and his mother later remarried, to William Elber Dillard, whom she also survived. He died in 1991, aged 92, and she followed less than a year later, although she was buried beside her first husband in Savannah's Bonaventure Cemetery.

In 1989, U.S. president George H. W. Bush presented Adler with the National Medal of Arts for "civic leadership in preserving for all time the beauty of Savannah."

In 1994, Adler rose to fame after his appearance in the John Berendt non-fiction novel Midnight in the Garden of Good and Evil, which highlighted his sour relationship with its central character James Arthur Williams, a fellow Savannah preservationist. Having lived in Ardsley Park when they were first married, the Adlers later moved to 425 Bull Street, part of the Charles Rogers Duplex, located across West Wayne Street from the Mercer House home of Williams, on the western side of Monterey Square. (Adler's name was changed to Lorne Atwell in the Clint Eastwood-directed 1997 screenplay.) Adler once refused to shake Berendt's hand in front of a reporter. According to Berendt, Adler later apologized.

The Adlers won the John Macpherson Berrien Award for Lifetime Achievement from the Georgia Historical Society in 2003.

Death 
Adler died on January 29, 2012, in Skidaway Island, Georgia. He was 88. He is interred in Bonaventure Cemetery, alongside his wife, who survived him by eight years. She was 90 years old.

After his death, the Historic Savannah Foundation established the Lee and Emma Adler Preservation Advocacy Award.

References 

1923 births
2012 deaths
Historical preservationists
Burials in Georgia (U.S. state)
People from Savannah, Georgia
Deerfield Academy alumni
Brown University alumni
University of Georgia alumni
United States Naval Aviators